Ichilampady  is a mid-sized village in Kasaragod district in the state of Kerala, India.

References

Suburbs of Kasaragod